Events in the year 1853 in Portugal.

Incumbents
Monarch: Mary II (until November 15); Peter V
Prime Minister: João Carlos Saldanha de Oliveira Daun, 1st Duke of Saldanha

Events

15 November – Queen Maria II of Portugal dies and is succeeded by  Pedro V of Portugal.

Arts and entertainment

Sports

Births

11 February – Artur Loureiro, painter (b. 1932).

Deaths

15 November – Maria II of Portugal, queen (born 1819).

References

 
1850s in Portugal
Years of the 19th century in Portugal
Portugal